The Retribution Tour was a 2005 concert tour by English heavy metal band, Judas Priest, which was in support of the album, Angel of Retribution. It ran from 23 February 2005 until 3 December 2005.

The 18 & 19 May shows from Tokyo were filmed, in which the footage from the 19 May show was used for the live DVD, Rising in the East, which was released on 15 November 2005.

Setlist

From 23 February 2005
 "The Hellion"
 "Electric Eye"
 "Riding on the Wind"
 "The Ripper"
 "A Touch of Evil"
 "Judas Rising"
 "Revolution"
 "Hot Rockin'"
 "Breaking the Law"
 "I'm a Rocker"
 "Diamonds & Rust" (Joan Baez cover)
 "Deal With the Devil"
 "Hellrider"
 "Beyond the Realms of Death"
 "Exciter"
 "Victim of Changes"
 "The Green Manalishi (With the Two Prong Crown) (Fleetwood Mac cover)
 "Painkiller"
 "Hell Bent for Leather"
 "Living After Midnight"
 "You've Got Another Thing Comin'"

From 2 March 2005
 "The Hellion"
 "Electric Eye"
 "Metal Gods"
 "Riding on the Wind"
 "The Ripper"
 "A Touch of Evil"
 "Judas Rising"
 "Revolution"
 "Hot Rockin'"
 "Breaking the Law"
 "I'm a Rocker"
 "Diamonds & Rust" (Joan Baez cover)
 "Deal With the Devil"
 "Beyond the Realms of Death"
 "Turbo Lover"
 "Exciter"
 "Victim of Changes"
 "The Green Manalishi (With the Two-Pronged Crown) (Fleetwood Mac cover)
 "Painkiller"
 "Hell Bent for Leather"
 "Living After Midnight"
 "You've Got Another Thing Comin'"

From 19 May 2005
 "The Hellion"
 "Electric Eye"
 "Metal Gods"
 "Riding on the Wind"
 "The Ripper"
 "A Touch of Evil"
 "Judas Rising"
 "Revolution"
 "Hot Rockin'"
 "I'm a Rocker"
 "Diamonds & Rust" (Joan Baez cover)
 "Worth Fighting For"
 "Deal With the Devil"
 "Beyond the Realms of Death"
 "Turbo Lover"
 "Hellrider"
 "Victim of Changes"
 "Exciter"
 "Painkiller"
 "Hell Bent for Leather"
 "Living After Midnight"
 "You've Got Another Thing Comin'"

From 5 October 2005
 "The Hellion"
 "Electric Eye"
 "Solar Angels"
 "Riding on the Wind"
 "A Touch of Evil"
 "Judas Rising"
 "Revolution"
 "I'm a Rocker"
 "Breaking the Law"
 "Diamonds & Rust" (Joan Baez cover)
 "Worth Fighting For"
 "Beyond the Realms of Death"
 "Turbo Lover"
 "Hellrider"
 "Victim of Changes"
 "Painkiller"
 "Desert Plains"
 "Living After Midnight"
 "You've Got Another Thing Comin'"

Tour dates
The band would tour with In Flames for the first European leg, with Scorpions for the UK leg, second European leg and Japanese leg, with Queensrÿche for the first North American leg, with Whitesnake for the Latin American leg and with Anthrax for most of the second North American leg. Hatebreed was added to the lineup for the 5 October date only 

Cancelled dates

Box office score data 
The attendance data reveals the first batch of box office scores from select venues from 1 October to 21 October 2005. The second batch reveals the select scores from 25 June to 12 November 2005

References

Judas Priest concert tours
2005 concert tours